Randolph A. Credico (born 1954) is an American perennial political candidate, comedian, radio host, and activist, and the former director of the William Moses Kunstler Fund for Racial Justice.

Entertainment career

Credico was formerly active on the comedy circuit, and at the age of 27 made an appearance on The Tonight Show Starring Johnny Carson. During a later appearance he compared Ambassador Jeane Kirkpatrick to Eva Braun; he was never invited on the show again. Credico was featured on the comedy album Strange Bedfellows: Comedy and Politics (1988) along with Jimmy Tingle, Barry Crimmins, and Will Durst.

Credico spent four years in Tulia, Texas, bringing national attention to a racially charged mass drug arrest. The Kunstler Fund produced an award-winning documentary on the subject entitled Tulia, Texas: Scenes from the drug war, written, directed and edited by Emily Kunstler and Sarah Kunstler, the daughters of attorney William Kunstler. Credico is the subject of the film Sixty Spins Around the Sun, directed by comedian Laura Kightlinger.

Credico produced, directed and wrote the radio program 60 Mimics, and is a frequent guest on Live from the State Capitol with Fred Dicker, a political talk radio program on WGDJ in Albany, New York.

Political activism
At age 37, Credico began a periodic campaign against New York state's Rockefeller drug laws, which he claimed were too harsh, disproportionately affecting the poor and minorities. Small changes softening the stiffest penalties were passed in the state legislature, which Credico thought were insufficient.

In 2010, Credico attended a meeting of the New York State Senate on Open Government dressed as the Greek philosopher Diogenes the Cynic, "seeking an honest politician." In the early 2010s, Credico became a perennial candidate for political office.

Credico's most significant appearance in the 2016 election cycle was headlining a Republican fund-raiser in Cayuga County, New York.

2010 U.S. Senate election

Credico ran as a Democratic primary challenger against Senator Chuck Schumer in 2010. Credico submitted petitions in an effort to get onto the Democratic Party primary ballot. The party chairman claimed that Credico only submitted a few pages' worth of petitions to the state, far short of the 15,000 necessary, a charge Credico denied. Credico threatened to throw his support to Republican candidate Carl Paladino in the gubernatorial race. He made the ballot.

Credico's campaign was supported by several actors and comedians, including Seinfeld co-creator Larry David, Roseanne Barr, and "Professor" Irwin Corey. He was nominated by the Libertarian Party of New York and the nascent "Anti-Prohibition Party" of Kristin "Manhattan Madam" Davis, though those parties do not have permanent ballot access and were required to petition their way onto the ballot. Credico finished with 25,975 votes (0.6%), in last place among the four candidates; in most jurisdictions, Credico was only given one ballot line despite petitioning for two.

Credico sued the New York State Board of Elections under the Equal Protection Clause of the Fourteenth Amendment over this issue of ballot access. On June 19, 2013, the Federal District Court for the Eastern District of New York ruled in favor of Credico. The New York State Board of Elections did not appeal this decision.

2013 mayoral election

Credico ran for the Democratic nomination for Mayor of New York City in the 2013 election. He received 12,685 votes (2.0%). He also appeared on the ballot in the general election with 14 other candidates, on the Tax Wall Street line, receiving 654 votes (0.1%).

2014 gubernatorial election

Credico challenged incumbent Democratic Governor Andrew Cuomo in the 2014 Democratic primary. He came in third among three candidates, with 20,760 votes (3.6%).

Connection with Roger Stone and WikiLeaks

Arranged by Margaret Ratner Kunstler, a mutual friend who is Julian Assange's attorney, Credico hosted Assange on Credico's August 25, 2016, radio show.

On August 27, 2016, Credico sent a text message to Roger Stone saying, "Julian Assange has kryptonite on Hillary." Credico notified Stone of subsequent releases by WikiLeaks of numerous emails stolen from John Podesta and the Hillary Clinton campaign, a publication which initiated releases of information on October 7, 2016.

In November 2017, Stone told the House Intelligence Committee that Credico was his intermediary with Assange to obtain information on Hillary Clinton. Credico was then subpoenaed to appear before the committee, but asserted his Fifth Amendment right before the interview. The committee released him from appearing. By August 2018, special counsel Mueller had subpoenaed Credico to testify before a grand jury in September 2018. Credico complied with the request. 

Mother Jones reported that Credico had received text messages from Stone in January 2018 stating that Stone was seeking a presidential pardon for Assange.

In January 2019, Stone was arrested by the FBI. His indictment claimed that Credico, referred to as "Person 2," was not Stone's sole contact with WikiLeaks ("Organization 1"). It also claimed that Credico was pressured by Stone to "stonewall" his testimony before Congress, and to "do a Frank Pentangeli." Among other statements, Stone told Credico to "prepare to die," and that he would "take that dog away from you." Credico relies on a medical support dog. Credico subsequently testified against Stone during Stone's trial in November 2019.

See also
 Timeline of Russian interference in the 2016 United States elections
 Timeline of Russian interference in the 2016 United States elections (July 2016 – election day)
 Timeline of investigations into Trump and Russia (January–June 2018)
 Timeline of investigations into Trump and Russia (July–December 2018)
 Timeline of investigations into Trump and Russia (2019)

References

External links
 Kunstler Fund Page
 
 
 Randy Credico for Senate 2010 campaign site 
 Credico bio at Tobaccoissues.com
 Activist/comedian is aiming to ‘chuck’ Schumer in election 
 Credico for Mayor 
 Credico for Governor website

1954 births
Living people
American male comedians
20th-century American comedians
American impressionists (entertainers)
American satirists
American drug policy reform activists
New York (state) Democrats
New York (state) Libertarians
21st-century American politicians
People from the Las Vegas Valley
People from Pomona, California
Politicians from New York City
People associated with Russian interference in the 2016 United States elections
New York (state) Republicans